The 2004 AIHL season was the fifth season of the Australian Ice Hockey League (AIHL). It ran from 1 May 2004 until 29 August 2004, with the Goodall Cup finals following on 4 and 5 September 2004. The Newcastle North Stars won the V.I.P. Cup after finishing the regular season first in the league standings. The Western Sydney Ice Dogs won the Goodall Cup for the first time by defeating the Newcastle North Stars in the final.

Regular season 
The regular season began on 1 May 2004 and ran through to 29 August 2004 before the top four teams advanced to compete in the Goodall Cup playoff series.

Standings 

Source

Statistics

Scoring leaders 
List shows the ten top skaters sorted by points, then goals. Current as of 5 September 2004

Leading goaltenders 
Only the top five goaltenders, based on save percentage with a minimum 40% of the team's ice time. Current as of 5 September 2004

Goodall Cup playoffs 

The 2004 playoffs was scheduled for 4 September with the Goodall Cup final held on 5 September 2004. Following the end of the regular season the top four teams advanced to the playoff series which was held at the Erina Ice Arena in the Central Coast, New South Wales region. The series was a single game elimination with the two winning semi-finalists advancing to the Goodall Cup final. The Goodall Cup was won by Western Sydney Ice Dogs (1st title) who defeated the Newcastle North Stars 3–1 in the final.

All times are UTC+10:00

Semi-finals

Final

References

External links 
 Official AIHL website

AIHL 2004 season
AIHL
Australian Ice Hockey League seasons